BK Inter Bratislava is a Slovak professional basketball club founded in 1963 in the city of Bratislava. The club has won four Slovak League championships, with the last one being their 2017 championship.

Name through history
1963–1991: BK Inter Slovnaft
1991–2004: BK AŠK Inter Slovnaft
2004–2009: BK Inter Bratislava
2009–present: BK Inter Bratislava o.z

Season by season

Honours
Czechoslovak League
Winners (4): 1978–79, 1979–80, 1982–83, 1984–85
Slovak League
Winners (5): 1995–96, 2012–13, 2013–14, 2016–17, 2018–19
Slovak Cup
Winners (4): 1996, 2003, 2015, 2016

See also 
 Czechoslovak basketball clubs in European and worldwide competitions

Basketball teams established in 1963
Basketball in Czechoslovakia
Basketball teams in Slovakia
Sport in Bratislava
1963 establishments in Czechoslovakia